Francesca Delbanco (born May 1974) is an American novelist and screenwriter. She is the author of 2004 novel Ask Me Anything and co-creator of the Netflix series Friends from College (with Nicholas Stoller, to whom she is also married).

Early life and education 
Delbanco was born in May 1974 and grew up in Bennington, Vermont, the child of faculty members at Bennington College, Elena Greenhouse Delbanco and Nicholas F. Delbanco. She attended Harvard College, concentrating in history and literature of the United States and writing her senior thesis on William Faulkner's novel Go Down, Moses and concepts of familial honor in the Old South. She also took creative writing workshops, studying with Jayne Anne Phillips, Jamaica Kincaid and Richard Ford, and went on to earn an MFA from the University of Michigan.

Career
Between college and her MFA program, Delbanco worked in New York City for two and a half years, briefly in publicity for Warner Books, then for Seventeen magazine where she was an editorial assistant, then staff writer.

In 2004, Delbanco published a novel, Ask Me Anything.

In 2017, the serial comedy Friends from College debuted on Netflix, created by Delbanco and her husband Nicholas Stoller, who also directed the series. The first season, consisting of eight half-hour episodes drew some negative reaction, particularly criticism of a central plotline featuring an affair; however, Netflix viewers continued to watch the show and it was renewed for a second season. The second season premiered January 11, 2019.

Personal life
In 2005, Delbanco married screenwriter and director Nicholas Stoller, whom she met at a playwriting workshop for Harvard alumni in 2001. (While Delbanco and Stoller overlapped at Harvard and were aware of one another, they weren't directly acquainted.) They live in Los Angeles, California with their three children.

References

Living people
21st-century American novelists
American women screenwriters
Writers from Vermont
Harvard College alumni
University of Michigan alumni
1974 births
21st-century American screenwriters
21st-century American women writers